The Armenian national ice hockey team is the national men's ice hockey team of Armenia. They hosted the Division III, Group B tournament of the 2010 World Championships. They are managed by the Ice Hockey Federation of Armenia.

History
After finishing last in the 2004 and 2005 Division III tournaments (which included a 48–0 loss to Mexico), they won their first two games ever in 2006, defeating Ireland and Luxembourg. 

In 2008, Armenia was forced to withdraw from a Division III qualification tournament in Sarajevo, Bosnia and Herzegovina because Armenia refused to show their passports to IIHF officials; this incident resulted in a 2-year suspension for Armenia from any IIHF tournament. The use of ineligible players was also present on Armenia's U20 team.

In 2010, the IIHF allowed Armenia to compete again, under the conditions that Armenia was to release their final roster 6 months prior to any IIHF tournaments. Armenia hosted the 2010 IIHF World Championship Division III in Yerevan, Armenia. After large scale wins over South Africa and Mongolia, Armenia edged DPR Korea 7-6; Armenia later played DPR Korea in the gold medal game, but lost the final, as well as their chance to move ahead to Div II for 2011, 5-2. Days after the tournament, IIHF officials investigated and reported that Armenia had once again used ineligible players; the team was suspended indefinitely, and their statistics and final scores were expunged from the IIHF tournaments with all of their games marked as 5–0 forfeits towards the team.

World Championships record

All-time record against other nations
As of April 18, 2010

See also 

Armenia men's national junior ice hockey team
Armenia men's national under-18 ice hockey team
Armenian Hockey League
Ice hockey in Armenia
Karen Demirchyan Complex
Micah Aivazoff
Sport in Armenia
Yerevan Figure Skating and Hockey Sports School
Zach Bogosian
Zack Kassian

References

External links
 National Teams of ice Hockey 

National ice hockey teams in Europe
Ice hockey
Ice hockey in Armenia